Flight 861 may refer to

KLM Flight 861, hijacked on 25 November 1973
GP Express Flight 861 crashed on 8 June 1992

0861